Erik Lars-Olov Zetterström (born November 6, 1953) is a Swedish former professional ice hockey player who spent many years with Färjestads BK of the Elitserien, and also played briefly in the National Hockey League with the Vancouver Canucks.

Playing career
A smooth, mobile defender, Zetterström came up through the junior ranks at Färjestads and became a regular in 1972. He would become one of the club's top defenders, and represented Sweden at the 1977 and 1978 World Championships, winning a Silver medal in 1977.

In 1978, Zetterström signed as a free agent with the NHL's Vancouver Canucks. Joining the team along with fellow Swedes Thomas Gradin and Lars Lindgren, the trio were the first Europeans to suit up for the club in their history. While Gradin and Lindgren were successful and went on to solid NHL careers, Zetterström struggled. He played in only 14 games for the Canucks, recording one assist and a -10 rating, and spent most of the season in the Central Hockey League with the Dallas Black Hawks.

Zetterström was claimed by the Quebec Nordiques in the 1979 NHL Expansion Draft, but returned to Sweden to once again suit up for Färjestads. He would play for them until 1983, helping them to the Swedish Championship in 1981. He then joined the third-division Hammarö HC club, and played for them until retiring in 1987.

Career statistics

Regular season and playoffs

External links

1953 births
Cincinnati Stingers (CHL) players
Dallas Black Hawks players
Färjestad BK players
Living people
Ice hockey people from Stockholm
Swedish ice hockey defencemen
Undrafted National Hockey League players
Vancouver Canucks players